Consecration is a Serbian rock band from Belgrade. Their unique sound that incorporates elements from various musical genres earned them a growing fan base in the region.

History 
The band was formed in 2000 in Belgrade. Over the years the line-up has frequently been in a state of change, ranging all the way from three to six members before finally stabilizing in form of a three-piece band. The only member that was in the founding lineup and still plays in the band is the lead singer/guitarist Danilo Nikodinovski. 
Their debut album, "aux", was recorded in 2006. It consisted of seven tracks that all together last for near an hour. Dissatisfied with the lack of interest by local labels, the band decided to put both "aux" and the live album entitled "live 2nd april 2008" (containing five new tracks at the time) for free download in mid 2008. The release of "aux" was followed by positive local and foreign critics alike, praising the band's will and ability to refresh the dull Serbian heavy music scene. In the meantime, the band's fan base was growing rapidly, making it one of the most popular underground bands in Serbia.

In 2010, the band's second studio album titled ".avi" was released. This time, the album was released through Geenger Records from Croatia, as once again Serbian record companies failed to make an offer that would interest the band. After the release of ".avi", David Lazar Galić, a longtime bassist of the band (and also a founding member of Draconic), left the band due to personal issues and was replaced by Ivan Aranđelović. Consecration's live performances are rated very highly because of the big amount of energy presented on them. They played on several festivals in the region such as EXIT Fest, FENODOM and ARF Festival, along with others. They also performed live with the likes of The Ocean, Block Out, Knut, Hesus Attor, Charon and To/Die/For. The band already has already written a couple of new songs that will be present in the following release that's yet to be announced. These songs ("Vertikala", "Debeli Leptir" and "H1N1") are occasionally being played at the band's latest shows.

In March 2011, an independent label Prog Sphere Records has released a live EP Consecration in the Temple of the Smoke, which was recorded live on April 2, 2008 in SKC Livingroom, Belgrade. Consecration trio at the time (Danilo Nikodinovski, Nemanja Trećaković and David Lazar Galić) joined forces with three members of a Belgrade's band Temple of the Smoke to record this 20-minutes long EP under the name Consecration & Temple of the Smoke Big Band.

Musical style
Consecration's sound has a lot of different influences into it. In the "aux" period, the band stated that their main influences were bands such as Opeth, Katatonia, Anathema, Slowdive and Neurosis, thus being more sludge-oriented. However, on the second, and highly successful studio album (.avi), it is obvious that the band was this time rather more influenced by post-rock/post-metal/ambiental music (the band noted Isis, Sigur Rós, Tool and Godspeed You! Black Emperor as their main influences for the record). And indeed, the second album had more distorted, sludgy riffs with more influences from post rock and post metal, thus being much more ambiental than the previous one. The band is never in a rush to create a feeling, as their songs can last up to fourteen minutes ("Đavo Nije Urban"). The lyrics are few, have more meanings attached to them, and are open for personal interpretation. Danilo sings mostly in cleans, although there are growls on most of the songs from "aux" and the song "Idiot Glee" from ".avi". The bass is usually under various types of distortions on main riffs.

Band members 
Current:
 Matija Dagović - drums and percussion
 Ivan Aranđelović - bass
 Danilo Nikodinovski - vocals, guitar and synth

Past:
 Nikola Milojević (guitar)
 David Lazar Galić (bass)
 Milan Jejina (drums and percussion)
 Nemanja Trećaković - keyboards, samples and vocoder

Discography

Studio albums 
 Aux (2008)
 .avi (2010)
 Cimet (2013)
 Univerzum zna (2013)
 Grob (2015)
 Plava Laguna (2019)

Live albums 
 Live 2nd April 2008 (2008)

Extended plays 
 Consecration in the Temple of the Smoke (2011) - as Consecration & Temple of the Smoke Big Band

Other appearances 
 Demo masters 2/3 ("Absinthe Thoughts", "Aimless", 2005)

References

External links 
 Official website
 2010 interview with Danilo Nikodinovski on Prog Sphere

Serbian rock music groups
Alternative metal musical groups
Serbian post-rock groups
Serbian doom metal musical groups
Serbian experimental musical groups
Post-metal musical groups
Musical groups from Belgrade
Musical groups established in 2000